"Kevin Barry" is a popular Irish rebel song recounting the death of Kevin Barry, a member of the Irish Republican Army (IRA) who was hanged on 1 November 1920. He was 18 years old at the time. He is one of a group of IRA members executed in 1920–21 collectively known as The Forgotten Ten.

The ballad was penned shortly after his death by an author whose identity is unknown.  Barry's family investigated this in the 1920s, but were only told it was the work of an Irish emigrant living in Glasgow.  Some sources claim that it was written by Terrence Ward, a journalist, but this is incorrect: he actually wrote another song about Barry.  (At the very least it seems that nobody is actively claiming copyright of this song.) It is sung to the melody of "Rolling Home to Dear Old Ireland" (also known as "Rolling Home to" several other places).

It has been performed by many Irish groups including The Wolfe Tones and The Clancy Brothers. The American singer Paul Robeson included it in this album Songs of Struggle, although this version tones down the anti-British sentiment of the original.  On at least one occasion, in 1972, Leonard Cohen covered the song in concert.</ref>

The song has been one of the most enduringly popular of Irish songs and has been largely responsible for making Kevin Barry a household name.  It was said to be so popular with British troops during the Troubles that it was banned.  It was one of many Irish rebel ballads removed from RTÉ playlists during the period of the conflict in Northern Ireland.

"Kevin Barry" featured prominently in Frank McCourt's novel Angela's Ashes, and in the 1999 movie adaptation of the book.

Lyrics 
As the author is unknown, there is no definitive version, It can be sung with various verses added or omitted, or without the chorus, or other minor variations.  This is one version:

In Mountjoy jail one Monday morning
High upon the gallows tree,
Kevin Barry gave his young life
For the cause of liberty.
Just a lad of eighteen summers,
Still there's no one can deny,
As he walked to death that morning,
He proudly held his head on high.

Chorus

Shoot me like an Irish soldier.
Do not hang me like a dog,
For I fought to free old Ireland
On that still September morn.
All around the little bakery
Where we fought them hand to hand,
Shoot me like an Irish soldier,
For I fought to free Ireland

Just before he faced the hangman,
In his dreary prison cell,
British soldiers tortured Barry,
Just because he would not tell.
The names of his brave comrades,
And other things they wished to know.
Turn informer or we'll kill you
Kevin Barry answered "No".

Proudly standing to attention
While he bade his last farewell
To his broken hearted mother
Whose grief no one can tell.
For the cause he proudly cherished
This sad parting had to be
Then to death walked softly smiling
That old Ireland might be free.

Another martyr for old Ireland,
Another murder for the crown,
Whose brutal laws may kill the Irish,
But can't keep their spirit down.
Lads like Barry are no cowards.
From the foe they will not fly.
Lads like Barry will free Ireland,
For her sake they'll live and die.

References

External links
 Ballad lyrics

Irish songs